Helene Petersson (born 1956) is a Swedish social democratic politician. She has been a member of the Riksdag since 2004.

External links
Helene Petersson at the Riksdag website

Members of the Riksdag from the Social Democrats
Living people
1956 births
Women members of the Riksdag
Members of the Riksdag 2002–2006
21st-century Swedish women politicians
Date of birth missing (living people)